Wu Xuesong is a Chinese Sanda kickboxer. He is from Guangzhou Dragon Flying Fighting Club. As of September 2016, he is ranked the #6 lightweight in the world by LiverKick.

Career 
On January 17, 2015, in Kunlun Fight 17, Wu Continuous beat Pan, Liu and Zhao in a night, Win the 70 kg World Max Group D tournament bracket.

On March 8, 2015, in Kunlun Fight 20, Wu beat Nakano Takuya by TKO.

On 8 April 2016 in Haihu District Gym Center in Xining, Wu beat Alex Oller and Tayfun Ozcan, winning the 70 kg World Max 2016 Group G Tournament Final. In Kunlun Fight 50, Wu beat Sergio Kanters by decision.

Championships and awards 

 Kickboxing
 2016 Kunlun Fight World Max Group G Tournament Winner
 2015 Kunlun Fight World Max Group D Tournament Winner
 2014 Chinese Sanshou championship champion -70 kg

Kickboxing record

|-  style="background:#fbb;"
| 2020-07-05 || Loss||align=left| Song Shaoqiu || Wu Lin Feng 2020: King's Super Cup 3rd Group Stage|| Zhengzhou, China || TKO (Knee)|| 1 ||3:00
|-  style="background:#fbb;"
| 2020-06-13 || Loss||align=left| Ouyang Feng || Wu Lin Feng 2020: King's Super Cup 2nd Group Stage|| Zhengzhou, China || TKO || 1 ||
|-  style="background:#fbb;"
| 2020-05-15 || Loss||align=left| Pu Dongdong || Wu Lin Feng 2020: King's Super Cup 1st Group Stage|| Zhengzhou, China || Decision (Unanimous) || 3 || 3:00
|- 
|-  bgcolor="#FFBBBB"
| 2019-03-24 || Loss ||align="left" | Nikos Gkikas || Wu Lin Feng 2019: WLF x Gods of War XII - China vs Greece || Athens, Greece ||Decision (Unanimous)|| 3 || 3:00
|- 
|-  bgcolor="#FFBBBB"
| 2018-12-26 || Loss ||align="left" | Meng Qinghao || King Of Kungfu Champion Fight || China ||Decision (Unanimous)|| 3 || 3:00
|- 
|-  bgcolor="#CCFFCC"
| 2018-12-15 || Win ||align="left" | Boonyok Anuchit || King Of Kungfu Champion Fight || China ||Decision (Unanimous)|| 3 || 3:00  
|- 
|-  bgcolor="#FFBBBB"
| 2018-07-28 || Loss ||align="left" | Giannis Skordilis || FF || Shenzhen, China || KO (Left High Kick) || 2 ||
|- 
|-  bgcolor="#FFBBBB"
| 2018-04-15 || Loss ||align="left" | Nishikawa Tomoyuki || Kunlun Fight 72 || Beijing, China || Ex.R Decision (Unanimous) || 4 ||3:00
|-
|-  bgcolor="#FFBBBB"
| 2017-11-12 || Loss ||align=left| Victor Nagbe || Kunlun Fight 67  || China || KO (Left Body Cross) || 2 || 1:38 
|- 
|-  bgcolor="#FFBBBB"
| 2017-08-23 || Loss ||align=left| Pord Kachoenram || The World Boxing Championship of Wang zhe hui meng || Lv liang, China || Decision (Unanimous) || 3 || 3:00 
|-
|-  bgcolor="#CCFFCC"
| 2017-06-24 || Win ||align=left| Mass|| Yunfeng Duel || Laizhou, China || TKO (Referee Stoppage) || 2 ||
|-  
|-  bgcolor="#FFBBBB"
| 2017-06-10 || Loss ||align=left| Martin Gano || Kunlun Fight 62 || Bangkok, Thailand || Decision (Unanimous) || 3 || 3:00 
|- 
|-  bgcolor="#CCFFCC"
| 2017-04-28 || Win ||align=left| Diego Ben Dizzie || Zhanlang Duel || Hunan, China ||Decision (Unanimous)|| 3 || 3:00  
|- 
|-  bgcolor="#FFBBBB"
| 2017-03-25 || Loss ||align=left| Nikola Cimesa || Kunlun Fight 59 -70 kg World Max 2017 Group 4 Tournament Final || China ||Decision (Unanimous)|| 3 || 3:00  
|- 
|-  bgcolor="#CCFFCC"
| 2017-03-25 || Win||align=left| Jose Ruelas || Kunlun Fight 59 -70 kg World Max 2017 Group 4 Tournament Semi-Finals || China ||KO (Left Hook) || 2 || 1:34
|- 
|-  bgcolor="#FFBBBB"
| 2017-01-01 || Loss ||align=left| Andrei Kulebin || Kunlun Fight 56 || Sanya, China || Decision (Unanimous) || 3 || 3:00  
|- 
|-  bgcolor="#FFBBBB"
| 2016-10-30 || Loss ||align=left| Cedric Manhoef || Kunlun Fight 54 -70 kg 2016 Tournament Quarter-Finals || Hubei, China || Decision (Unanimous) || 3 || 3:00  
|- 
|-  bgcolor="#CCFFCC"
| 2016-08-20 || Win ||align=left| Sergio Kanters || Kunlun Fight 50 -70 kg 2016 Tournament 1/8 Finals || Jinan, China || Decision (Unanimous) || 3 || 3:00  
|- 
! style=background:white colspan=9 | 
|-  bgcolor="#CCFFCC"
| 2016-06-05 || Win ||align=left| Levgenii Schevchenko || Kunlun Fight 45 || Jinan, China || Ext.R Decision (Unanimous) || 4 || 3:00  
|- 
|-  bgcolor="#CCFFCC"
| 2016-05-13 || Win ||align=left| Wen Sor. Pettawee || United Fighting Union || Shenzhen, China || KO || 1 || 1:35  
|- 
|-  bgcolor="#FFBBBB"
| 2016-04-26 || Loss ||align=left| Farkhad Akhmejanov || 2016 Hanzhong King Championship  || Hanzhong, China || Ext.R Decision (unanimous) || 4 || 3:00  
|-  
|-  bgcolor="#CCFFCC"
| 2016-04-08 || Win ||align=left| Tayfun Özcan || Kunlun Fight 41 -70 kg World Max 2016 Group G Tournament Final || Xining, China || KO (Left Hook) || 2 || 0:26
|- 
! style=background:white colspan=9 | 
|-  bgcolor="#CCFFCC"
| 2016-04-08 || Win ||align=left| Alexsander Silva || Kunlun Fight 41 -70 kg World Max 2016 Group G Tournament Semi-Finals || Xining, China || TKO (Referee Stoppage) || 2 || 0:55
|- 
|-  bgcolor="#FFBBBB"
| 2016-03-12 || Loss ||align=left| Masoud Minaei || The Legend of Emei - 6 || Xichang, China || Decision (Unanimous) || 3 || 3:00  
|-  
|-  bgcolor="#FFBBBB"
| 2015-10-31 || Loss ||align=left| Kong Lingfeng || Kunlun Fight 33 -Middleweight Tournament 1/8 Finals || Changde, China || Decision (Unanimous) || 3 || 3:00  
|- 
|-  bgcolor="#CCFFCC"
| 2015-09-04 || Win ||align=left| Konstantinov Dmytro || Kunlun Fight 30 / Topking World Series: TK5 || Zhoukou, China || Decision (Unanimous) || 3 || 3:00 
|-  
|-  bgcolor="#FFBBBB"
| 2015-05-15 || Loss ||align=left| Vlad Tuinov || Kunlun Fight 25 || Banská Bystrica, Slovakia || Decision (Unanimous) || 3 || 3:00   
|-
|-  bgcolor="#CCFFCC"
| 2015-03-08 || Win ||align=left| Nakano Takuya  || Kunlun Fight 20 || Foshan, China || TKO (Referee Stoppage) || 2 ||   
|- 
|-  bgcolor="#CCFFCC"
| 2015-01-17 || Win ||align=left| Zhao Yan || Kunlun Fight 17 -Middleweight Tournament Group D Final || Nanjing, China || Decision (Unanimous) || 3 || 3:00  
|-
! style=background:white colspan=9 | 
|-  bgcolor="#CCFFCC"
| 2015-01-17 || Win ||align=left| Liu Mingzhi || Kunlun Fight 17 -Middleweight Tournament Group D Semi-finals || Nanjing, China || Decision (Unanimous) || 3 || 3:00  
|- 
|-  bgcolor="#CCFFCC"
| 2015-01-17 || Win ||align=left| Pan Hongmin || Kunlun Fight 17 -Middleweight Tournament Group D Quarter-finals || Nanjing, China || TKO (Referee Stoppage) || 1 ||   
|- 
|-  bgcolor="#FFBBBB"
| 2014-09-26 || Loss ||align=left| Arthur Sorsor || WBK 1 - Ningbo || Ningbo, China || Decision (Unanimous) || 3 || 3:00  
|- 
|-  bgcolor="#CCFFCC"
| 2014-06-01 || Win ||align=left| Dzmitry Nason || Kunlun Fight 5 || Chengdu, China || Decision (Unanimous) || 3 || 3:00  
|- 
|-  bgcolor="#FFBBBB"
| 2013-08-24 || Loss ||align=left| Hu Yafei || Wu Lin Feng Championship 2013 – 70 kg Tournament, Semi Finals || Huaibei, China || Decision (Unanimous) || 3 || 3:00    
|- 
|-
| colspan=9 | Legend:

References 

Chinese male kickboxers
Lightweight kickboxers
1993 births
Living people
Kunlun Fight kickboxers
Sportspeople from Guangdong